John Adam Hasecoster (1844–1925) was an American architect in Indiana. His practice was located in Richmond, Indiana.  He designed public buildings as well as residences in the area, some of which have been listed on the National Register of Historic Places.

Early life and education
Hasecoster was born in Osnabrück, Germany, where his father was a master builder.  After studying drafting at Nienburg, Hasecoster emigrated to the United States in 1867.  He joined two older brothers George and Frederick in Richmond, Indiana, where a number of Germans from the Osnabrück area had settled in the middle 19th Century.

He completed his architecture study in St. Louis, Missouri, and Chicago and returned to Richmond in 1875 after a five-year apprenticeship.

Career
Hasecoster designed buildings in many European and American styles, including Second Empire, Romanesque, Gothic revival, and Craftsman.

Notable works

Abram Gaar House and Farm, 1876, Richmond, Indiana  (National Register of Historic Places)
Franklin County, Indiana Courthouse, 1877 remodeling, Brookville, Indiana
Knightstown Academy, 1876, Knightstown, Indiana (National Register of Historic Places)
Wernle Children's Home, 1893, Richmond, Indiana
Reid Memorial Hospital, 1904, Richmond, Indiana 
Lincoln Hall, Indiana Soldiers' and Sailors' Children's Home, 1891, Knightstown, Indiana (National Register of Historic Places)
Administration Building, Indiana Soldiers' and Sailors' Children's Home, 1888, Knightstown, Indiana (National Register of Historic Places)
Gaar-Scott & Company Office (now Richmond Baking offices), Richmond, Indiana
St. John's Lutheran Church, 1908, Richmond, Indiana
Henry and Alice Gennett residence, 1897, Richmond, Indiana (National Register of Historic Places)
David Worth Dennis residence, Richmond, Indiana
Wayne Flats (now Bradford Place), 1903, Richmond, Indiana

Sources
Tomlan, Mary Raddant and Michael A.  Richmond, Indiana: Its Physical and Aesthetic Heritage to 1920, Indianapolis: Indiana Historical Society, 2003
Royer, Donald M.  The German-American Contribution to Richmond's Development, Vol. II,  Richmond, Indiana: The Richmond German Heritage Society, 1993

External links

1844 births
1925 deaths
Architects from Indiana
German emigrants to the United States
Artists from Richmond, Indiana
Architects from Osnabrück